China–German relations were formally established in 1861, when Prussia and the Qing dynasty concluded a Sino-German treaty during the Eulenburg expedition. A decade later, the German Empire was established, with the new state inheriting the Prussian-era treaties concluded with China. Sino-German relations during the late 19th and early 20th century were frequently tense, as Germany followed the example of other European colonial powers in carving out a sphere of influence in China; by 1914, Germany had obtained several concessions in China, including the treaty ports of Yantai and Qingdao and most prominently the Jiaozhou Bay Leased Territory.

Germany was a member of the Eight-Nation Alliance, and the Imperial German Army participated in the suppression of the Boxer Rebellion. After World War I, during which Germany lost all its territories in China, Sino-German relations gradually improved as German military advisers assisted the Kuomintang government's National Revolutionary Army, though this would change during the 1930s as Adolf Hitler gradually allied himself with Japan. During the aftermath of World War II, Germany was divided in two states: a liberal and democratic West Germany and a communist East Germany. Cold War tensions led to a West German alliance with the United States against communism and thus allied against the People's Republic of China (PRC). The Eastern part was allied through the Soviet Union with the PRC. After German reunification, relations between Germany and China have gradually and vastly improved.

History

Early contacts 

Unlike Portugal or the Netherlands, German states were not involved, on the state level, in the early (16-17th centuries) contacts between Europe and China. Nonetheless, a number of individual Germans reached China at that time, in particular as Jesuit missionaries. Some of them played a significant role in China's history, as did Johann Adam Schall von Bell (in China in 1619–1666), who was in Beijing when it was taken by the Manchus in 1644, and soon became a trusted counselor of the early Qing leaders. Meanwhile, in Rome another German Jesuit, Athanasius Kircher, who never got to go to China himself, used reports of other Jesuits in China to compile China Illustrata, a work that was instrumental in popularizing knowledge about China among the 17th-century European readers.

The earliest Sino-German trading occurred overland through Siberia, and was subject to transit taxes by the Russian government. In order to make trading more profitable, German traders took the sea route and the first German merchant ships arrived in China, then under the Qing Dynasty, as part of the Royal Prussian Asian Trading Company of Emden, in the 1750s.

Early diplomatic relations 

In 1859, following China's defeat in the Second Opium War, Prussia sent the Eulenburg Expedition to negotiate commercial treaties with China, Japan and Siam. On 2 September 1861, Friedrich Albrecht zu Eulenburg and a representative from the Zongli Yamen signed the Treaty of Tianjin, which opened formal commercial relations between China and Prussia, which represented the German Customs Union. Prussia would later on become the dominant and leading part of the newly founded German Empire. The treaty would govern Sino-German relations until World War I, when the Republic of China repudiated the treaty unilaterally.

During the late 19th century, Sino-foreign trade was dominated by the British Empire, and Otto von Bismarck was eager to establish German footholds in China to balance the British dominance. In 1885, Bismarck had the Reichstag pass a steamship subsidy bill which offered direct service to China. In the same year, he sent the first German banking and industrial survey group to evaluate investment possibilities, which led to the establishment of the Deutsch-Asiatische Bank in 1890. Through these efforts, Germany was second to Britain in trading and shipping in China by 1896.

In 1897, the German empire took advantage of the murder of two German missionaries to invade Qingdao and founded the Jiaozhou Bay colony. Germany took control of key points in the Shandong Peninsula. In 1898, It leased for 99 years Jiaozhou Bay and its port of Qingdao under threat of force. Development was a high priority for Berlin. Over 200 million marks were invested in  world-class harbor facilities such as berths, heavy machinery, rail yards, and a floating dry dock. Private enterprise worked across the Shandong Province, opening mines, banks, breweries, factories, shops and rail lines.  In 1900, Germany took part in the Eight-Nation Alliance that was sent to relieve the Siege of the International Legations in Beijing during the Boxer Uprising. China paid a large annual indemnity.

During the Xinhai revolution, revolutionaries killed a German arms dealer in Hankou as he was delivering arms to the Qing. Revolutionaries killed 2 Germans and wounded 2 other Germans at the battle of Hanyang, including a former colonel.

Sino-German cooperation (1912-1941) 

The German military had a major role in Republican China. The German Navy's East Asia Squadron was in charge of Germany's concessions at Qingdao, and spent heavily to set up modern facilities that would be a showcase for Asia. Japan seized the German operations in 1914 after sharp battles. After World War I, the German republic provided extensive advisory services to the Republic of China, especially training for the Chinese army. Colonel General Hans von Seeckt, the former commander the German army, organized the training of China's elite army units and the fight against communists in 1933–1935. All military academies had German officers, as did most army units. In addition, German engineers provided expertise and bankers provided loans for China's railroad system. Trade with Germany flourished in the 1920s, with Germany as China's largest supplier of government credit. The last major advisor left in 1938, after Nazi Germany allied itself with Japan, the great enemy of the Republic of China. Nevertheless Chiang Kai-shek continued in his hopes to use Germany as a model for his nation, as his mentor Sun Yat-sen had recommended.

Although intense cooperation lasted only from the Nazi takeover of Germany in 1933 to the start of the war with Imperial Japan in 1937, and concrete measures at industrial reform started in earnest only in 1936, it had a profound effect on Chinese modernization and capability to resist the Japanese in the war.

Finance minister of China and Kuomintang official H.H. Kung and two other Chinese Kuomintang officials visited Germany in 1937 and were received by Adolf Hitler.

At the same time, the exiled German Communist Otto Braun was in China as a Comintern agent, sent in 1934, to advise the Chinese Communist Party (CCP) on military strategy and taking a major part in The Long March under a Chinese name, Li De; it was only many years later that Otto Braun and "Li De" came to be known as the same person.

World War II (1941–1945) 

Sino-German cooperation collapsed in 1939 due to the start of World War II in Europe, forcing many Chinese nationals to leave Germany due to increased government surveillance and coercion. The example Japan set in the Second Sino-Japanese War forced Hitler to replace China with Japan as the Nazi's strategic ally in East Asia. Following the Japanese Attack on Pearl Harbor in 1941, the Chinese declared war on Germany, which resulted in the Gestapo launching mass arrests of Chinese nationals across Germany. At the end of the war, the Chinese communities in cities such as Berlin, Hamburg, and Bremen that existed before the war were destroyed.

Division of Germany and the Cold War (1945-1990)

The Federal Republic of Germany or West Germany initially did not recognize the People's Republic of China primarily because of its hard-line anti-communist foreign policy of the Hallstein Doctrine. West Germany formally supported the One-China policy, in hopes of finding Chinese backing of the reunification of Germany. In October 1972, West Germany officially established diplomatic contacts with the PRC, although unofficial contacts had been in existence since 1964.

The German Democratic Republic also managed to have good relations with the PRC, despite the Sino-Soviet Split that occurred for most of the Cold War until the 1989 Sino-Soviet Summit. Since the March 1982 speech on Sino-Soviet rapprochement by General Secretary Leonid Brezhnev to the Communist Party of Uzbekistan in Tashkent, Sino-East German relations began to steadily improve. In June 1986, Foreign Minister Wu Xueqian visited East Berlin in the highest-level Chinese delegation to Eastern Europe since the 1961 split. Moreover, Chairman Erich Honecker visited Beijing in early October 1986, where he was met by President Li Xiannian with in a welcoming ceremony on Tiananmen Square a military band and a marchpast by the People's Liberation Army honor guard. The visit became the first official visit by an Eastern Bloc leader to the PRC.

Reunified Germany (1990-present)
The frequent high-level diplomatic visits are acknowledged to have helped guarantee the smooth development of Sino-German relations. From 1993 to 1998, German and Chinese leaders met face-to-face 52 times: Among those Chinese leaders who visited Germany were Jiang Zemin, former General Secretary of the Chinese Communist Party; Qiao Shi, former Chairman of the Standing Committee of the National People's Congress (NPC); and Li Peng, former Premier of China and Chairman of the NPC Standing. Meanwhile, German leaders who visited China included President Roman Herzog, Chancellor Helmut Kohl, Foreign Minister Klaus Kinkel and Minister of State at the German Federal Foreign Office Ludger Volmer. Among these leaders, Chancellor Kohl visited China twice in 1993 and 1995. Since the new German government came into power in October 1998, Chancellor Gerhard Schröder has paid three visits to China. One after another from Germany came Vice Prime Minister and Foreign Minister Joschka Fischer, Defense Minister Rudolf Scharping, and Minister of Economics and Technology Werner Müller. At the same time, Germany welcomed Chinese Primer Zhu Rongji, Foreign Minister Tang Jiaxuan, State Councilor Wu Yi, member of the Political Bureau of the CCP Central Committee Wei Jianxing as well as member of the CCP Politburo Standing Committee Hu Jintao.

Relations would continue to improve after 1998. For instance, both Beijing and Berlin fervently opposed the invasion of Iraq in 2003, and in 2006 both Germany (the largest economy and the most populous country of the European Union) and China further enhanced their bilateral political, economic and diplomatic ties within the framework of Sino-EU strategic partnerships. Both Germany and China opposed direct military involvement in the 2011 Libyan civil war. Before the 2011 visit of China's PM Wen Jiabao, the Chinese government issued a "White Book on the accomplishments and perspective of Sino-German cooperation", the first of its kind for a European country. The visit also marked the first Sino-German government consultations, an exclusive mechanism for Sino-German communications.

In July 2019, the UN ambassadors from 22 nations, including Germany, signed a joint letter to the UNHRC condemning China's mistreatment of the Uyghurs as well as its mistreatment of other minority groups, urging the CCP leader Xi Jinping's government to close the Xinjiang internment camps.

In September 2019, China's ambassador to Germany stated that the meeting between Germany's foreign minister and Hong Kong activist Joshua Wong will damage relations with China.

On 22 April 2020, Germany's Interior Ministry released a letter revealing that Chinese diplomats had contacted German Government officials to encourage them to make positive statements on how China was handling the coronavirus pandemic. The German government did not comply with these requests.

In December 2020, with Germany ending its 2-year term on the United Nations Security Council, Chinese Ambassador Geng Shuang responded "Out of the bottom of my heart: good riddance" in response to the German Ambassador Christoph Heusgen's appeal to free two Canadians Michael Kovrig and Michael Spavor detained in China.

In October 2021 a tweet from the Global Times called for a “final solution to the Taiwan question” which was condemned by German politician Frank Müller-Rosentritt for its similarity to the “final solution to the Jewish question” which resulted in the Holocaust.

In December 2021 as a result of a diplomatic spat between Lithuania and China over Taiwan and human rights China pressured Continental AG and other German companies to stop doing business with Lithuania. The Bundesverband der Deutschen Industrie described the expansion of the ban on importing Lithuanian goods to components in integrated supply chains as a “devastating own goal.”

Trade 
Germany is China's biggest trading partner and technology exporter in Europe.

China is Germany's largest trading partner, superseding the United States since 2017.

The trade volume between China and Germany surpassed 100 billion U.S. dollars in 2008. By 2014 German Chancellor Angela Merkel had visited China on trade missions seven times since assuming office in 2005, underlining the importance of China to the German economy.

In 2018, Mercedes-Benz apologized to China for quoting the Dalai Lama on Instagram.

Huawei, a major Chinese tech company, has collaborated with Porsche Design, a German design company in developing their Porsche Design Huawei Smartwatch GT 2

Human rights criticisms

Hong Kong national security law
In June 2020, Germany openly opposed the Hong Kong national security law

On 6 October 2020, Germany's ambassador to the UN, on behalf of the group of 39 countries including Germany, the U.K. and the U.S., made a statement to denounce China for its treatment of ethnic minorities and for curtailing freedoms in Hong Kong.

Resident diplomatic missions 
 China has an embassy in Berlin and consulates-general in Düsseldorf, Frankfurt, Hamburg and Munich.
 Germany has an embassy in Beijing and consulates-general in Chengdu, Guangzhou, Hong Kong, Shanghai and Shenyang.

See also
 China–European Union relations
 East Asia Squadron, Germany naval operations based in China to 1914

References

Further reading

 Albers, Martin. "Business with Beijing, détente with Moscow: West Germany's China policy in a global context, 1969–1982." Cold War History 14.2 (2014): 237–257.
 Bernier, Lucie. "Christianity and the Other: Friedrich Schlegel's and F.W.J. Schelling's Interpretation of China." International Journal of Asian Studies 2.2 (2005): 265–273.
 Chen, Zhong Zhong. "Defying Moscow: East German-Chinese relations during the Andropov-Chernenko interregnum, 1982–1985." Cold War History 14.2 (2014): 259–280.
 Cho, Joanne Miyang, and David M. Crowe, eds. Germany and China: Transnational Encounters since the Eighteenth Century (2014) online review
 Depner, Heiner, and Harald Bathelt. "Exporting the German model: the establishment of a new automobile industry cluster in Shanghai." Economic Geography 81.1 (2005): 53-81 online.
 Dijk, Kees van. Pacific Strife: The Great Powers and their Political and Economic Rivalries in Asia and the Western Pacific 1870-1914 (2015)
 Eberspaecher, Cord. "Arming the Beiyang Navy. Sino-German Naval Cooperation." International Journal of Naval History (2009) online.
 Fox, John P. "Max Bauer: Chiang Kai-shek's first German military adviser." Journal of Contemporary History 5.4 (1970): 21–44.
 Fox, John P. Germany and the Far Eastern Crisis, 1931-1938 (Clarendon Press, 1982)
 Gareis, Sven Bernhard. “Germany and China – A Close Partnership with Contradictions.” in Germany’s New Partners: Bilateral Relations of Europe’s Reluctant Leader, edited by Sven Bernhard Gareis and Matthew Rhodes, 1st ed. (Berlin: Verlag Barbara Budrich, 2019), pp. 87–108 online
 Garver, John W. "China, German Reunification, and the Five Principles of Peaceful Coexistence." Journal of East Asian Affairs 8.1 (1994): 135–172. online
 Groeneveld, Sabina. "Far away at Home in Qingdao (1897–1914)." German Studies Review 39.1 (2016): 65-79 online.
 Hall, Luella J. "The Abortive German-American-Chinese Entente of 1907-8." Journal of Modern History1#2 1929, pp. 219–235. online
 Heiduk, Felix. "Conflicting images? Germany and the rise of China." German Politics 23.1-2 (2014): 118-133 online.
 Jenkins, Jennifer L., et al. "Asia, Germany and the Transnational Turn." German History 28#4 (2010): 515–536.
 Jones, Francis I. W. "The German challenge to British shipping 1885–1914: its magnitude, nature and impact in China." Mariner's Mirror 76.2 (1990): 151–167.
 Klein, Thoralf. "Biography and the making of transnational imperialism: Karl Gützlaff on the China coast, 1831–1851." Journal of Imperial and Commonwealth History 47.3 (2019): 415-445 online.
 Kranzler, David. "Restrictions against German-Jewish Refugee Immigration to Shanghai in 1939." Jewish Social Studies 36.1 (1974): 40–60. online
 Kirby, William C. Germany and Republican China (Stanford UP, 1984).
 Kundnani, Hans, and Jonas Parello-Plesner. "China and Germany: why the emerging special relationship matters for Europe." European Council on Foreign Relations (2012) online.
 Lach, Donald F. “Leibniz and China.” Journal of the History of Ideas 6#4 (1945), pp. 436–455. online
 Lü, Yixu. "German Colonial Fiction on China: The Boxer Uprising of 1900." German Life and Letters 59.1 (2006): 78–100.
 Lü, Yixu. "Germany's war in China: media coverage and political myth." German Life and Letters 61.2 (2008): 202–214. On Boxer uprising.
 Mak, Ricardo K, S. et al. eds/ Sino-German Relations since 1800: Multidisciplinary Explorations (Frankfurt: Peter Lang, 2000)
 Martin, Bernd. Japan and Germany in the modern world (Berghahn books, 2006).
 Martin, Bernd. "The Prussian expedition to the Far East (1860–1862)." Journal of the Siam Society 78.1 (1990): 35–42. online
 Möller, Kay. "Germany and China: a continental temptation." China Quarterly 147 (1996): 706–725, covers 1960 to 1995.
 Port, Andrew I. "Courting China, Condemning China: East and West German Cold War Diplomacy in the Shadow of the Cambodian Genocide." German History 33.4 (2015): 588-608 online.
 Rodriguez, Robyn L. "Journey to the East: The German Military Mission in China, 1927-1938" (PhD Diss. The Ohio State University, 2011) online.
 Schäfer, Bernd. "Weathering the Sino-Soviet Conflict: The GDR and North Korea, 1949-1989." Cold War International History Project Bulletin 14.15 (2003): 2004.
 Schrecker, John E. Imperialism and Chinese Nationalism: Germany in Shantung (Harvard UP, 1971). online review
 Shen, Qinna. "Tiananmen Square, Leipzig, and the" Chinese Solution": Revisiting the Wende from an Asian-German Perspective." German Studies Review 42.1 (2019): 37-56 online.
 Skřivan, Aleš, and Aleš Skřivan. "Financial Battle for Beijing: The Great Powers and Loans to China, 1895–1898." Historian 79.3 (2017): 476–503.
 Slobodian, Quinn. "The Maoist Enemy: China’s Challenge in 1960s East Germany." Journal of Contemporary History 51.3 (2016): 635-659 online.
 Smith, Julianne, and Torrey Taussig. "The Old World and the Middle Kingdom: Europe Wakes up to China's Rise." Foreign Affairs. 98 (2019): 112+ How Angela Merkel et al. looked at China. online
 Sutton, Donald S. “German Advice and Residual Warlordism in the Nanking Decade: Influences on Nationalist Military Training and Strategy,” China Quarterly, No. 91. (September, 1982) 386–420.
 Walsh, Billie K. "The German military mission in China, 1928-38." Journal of Modern History  46.3 (1974): 502-513 online.
 Weinberg, Gerhard L. "German Recognition Of Manchoukuo" World Affairs Quarterly (1957) 28#2 pp 149–164.
 China Germany Investment Guide

 
Germany
Bilateral relations of Germany